

Events

January–March 
 January 1 – Ottawa, Ontario, is incorporated as a city.
 January 5 – Ramón Castilla begins his third term as President of Peru.
 January 23
 The first bridge over the Mississippi River opens in modern-day Minneapolis, a predecessor of the Father Louis Hennepin Bridge.
 The 8.2–8.3  Wairarapa earthquake claims between five and nine lives near the Cook Strait area of New Zealand.
 January 26 – The Point No Point Treaty is signed in the Washington Territory.
 January 27 – The Panama Railway becomes the first railroad to connect the Atlantic and Pacific Oceans.
 January 29 – Lord Aberdeen resigns as Prime Minister of the United Kingdom, over the management of the Crimean War.
 February 5 – Lord Palmerston becomes Prime Minister of the United Kingdom.
 February 11 – Kassa Hailu is crowned Tewodros II, Emperor of Ethiopia.
 February 12 – Michigan State University (the "pioneer" land-grant college) is established.
 February 15 – The North Carolina General Assembly incorporates the Western North Carolina Railroad, to build a rail line from Salisbury to the western part of the state.
 February 22 – Pennsylvania State University is founded, as the Farmers' High School of Pennsylvania.
 March 2 – Alexander II ascends the Russian throne, upon the death of his father Nicholas I.
 March 3 – The United States Congress appropriates $30,000 to create the U.S. Camel Corps.
 March 16 – Bates College is founded by abolitionists in Lewiston, Maine.
 March 17 – Taiping Rebellion: A Taiping army of 350,000 invades Anhui.
 March 30 – Elections are held for the first Kansas Territory legislature. Missourian 'Border Ruffians' cross the border in large numbers to elect a pro-slavery body.

April–June 
 April 3 – The Nepalese invasion of Tibet starts the Nepalese–Tibetan War (1855-1856).
 April 7 – Battle of Kaba: The Kingdom of Tonga intervenes in the war between the self-proclaimed Tui Viti (King) of Fiji, Cakobau, and his rivals the Confederation of Rewa resulting in Rewa's defeat and the tenuous unification of Fiji under Cakobau.
 April 18 – The Bordeaux Wine Official Classification of 1855 is first listed.
 May 1 – Van Diemen's Land is separated administratively from New South Wales and granted self-government.
 May 3 – American adventurer William Walker and a group of mercenaries sail from San Francisco to conquer Nicaragua.
 May 15
 The Exposition Universelle officially opens in Paris (a direct result of the exhibition is the introduction of the Bordeaux Wine Official Classification of 1855).
 The Great Gold Robbery is made from a train between London Bridge and Folkestone in England.
 May 17 – Mount Sinai Hospital, New York, is dedicated (as the Jews' Hospital) in New York City; it opens to patients on June 5.
 May 22 – The province of Victoria is separated administratively from New South Wales.
 June 15 – Stamp duty is removed from British newspapers, creating mass media in the United Kingdom.
 June 29 – The Daily Telegraph newspaper begins publication in London.

July–September 
 July – Bank of Toronto incorporated in Canada (in 1955 it will merge with The Dominion Bank to become Toronto-Dominion Bank).
 July 1 – The Quinault Treaty, in which the Quinault and Quileute tribes cede their land to the United States, is signed.
 July 2 – The Kansas territorial legislature convenes in Pawnee, and begins passing proslavery laws.
 July 4 – Walt Whitman's poetry collection Leaves of Grass is published in Brooklyn.
 July 16 – The Australian Colonies  are granted self-governing status by the United Kingdom.
 August 1 – Monte Rosa, the second-highest summit in the Alps, is first ascended.
 September 3 – The last Bartholomew Fair is held in London, England.
 September 9 (August 28 O.S.) – Crimean War: Siege of Sevastopol (1854–1855) – Sevastopol falls to French and British troops.
 September 27 – Alfred Tennyson reads from his new book Maud and other poems, at a social gathering in the home of Robert and Elizabeth Browning in London; Dante Gabriel Rossetti makes a sketch of him doing so.
 September 29 – The Port of Iloilo in the Philippines is opened to international trade, by Queen Isabel II of Spain. This year also the ports of Sual (modern-day Pangasinan) and Zamboanga City are opened to international trade.

October–December 
 October 17 – Henry Bessemer files his patent in the United Kingdom for the Bessemer process of steelmaking.
 October 24 – Van Diemen's Land is officially renamed Tasmania.
 November 17 – Scottish missionary explorer David Livingstone becomes the first European to see Victoria Falls, in modern-day Zambia–Zimbabwe.
 November 21 – Large-scale Bleeding Kansas violence begins, with events leading to the 'Wakarusa War' between antislavery and proslavery forces.
 November 10 – Henry Wadsworth Longfellow's fictional poem The Song of Hiawatha is published in Boston.
 December 11 – Ignacio Comonfort (1812-1863) becomes President of Mexico.
 December 22 – The Metropolitan Board of Works is established in London.

Date unknown 
 Samuel Colt incorporates his business as the Colt's Patent Firearms Manufacturing Company and opens a new factory, the Colt Armory, in Hartford, Connecticut.
 The cocaine alkaloid is first isolated by German chemist Friedrich Gaedcke.
 Palm oil sales from West Africa to the United Kingdom reach 40,000 tons.

Births

January–June 

 January 5 – King C. Gillette, American razor inventor (d. 1932)
 January 20 – Ernest Chausson, French composer (d. 1899)
 January 21
John Browning, American firearms inventor (d. 1926)
Henry Jackson, British admiral (d. 1929)
 February 6 – Barbara Galpin, American journalist (d. 1922)
 February 12 – Marie-Anne de Bovet, French writer
 February 13 – Paul Deschanel, President of France (d. 1922)
 February 17 – Otto Liman von Sanders, German general (d. 1929)
 February 24 – Johannes von Eben, German general (d. 1924)
 March 4 – Luther Emmett Holt, American pediatrician (d. 1924)
 March 12 – Eduard Birnbaum, Polish-born German cantor (d. 1920)
 March 13 – Percival Lowell, American astronomer (d. 1916)
 March 24 – Andrew Mellon, American banker, philanthropist (d. 1937)
 March 25 – Grace Carew Sheldon, American journalist and businesswoman (d. 1921)
 March 29 – James O. Barrows, American stage and screen actor (d.1925)
 April 9
Pavlos Kountouriotis, Greek admiral, 2-time president (d. 1935)
John Marden, Australian headmaster, pioneer of women's education (d. 1924)
 April 21 – Hardy Richardson, American baseball player (d. 1931)
 April 23 – Marco Fidel Suárez, 9th President of Colombia (d. 1927)
 April 27 – Caroline Rémy de Guebhard, French feminist (d. 1929)
 April 28 – Mario Nicolis di Robilant, Italian general (d. 1943)
 May 1 – Marie Corelli, English novelist (d. 1924)
 May 8 – Bohuslav Brauner, Czech chemist (d. 1935) 
 May 9 – Julius Röntgen, German-Dutch classical composer (d. 1932)
 May 10 – Swami Sri Yukteswar Giri, Bengali yogi, author of The Holy Science (d. 1936)
 May 21
 Émile Verhaeren, Belgian poet (d. 1916)
 Ella Stewart Udall, American telegraphist (d. 1937)
 May 23 – Isabella Ford, English socialist, feminist, trade unionist and writer (d. 1924)
 May 28 – Emilio Estrada Carmona, 18th President of Ecuador (d. 1911)
 June 1 – Edward Angle, American dentist (d. 1930)
 June 2 – Archibald Berkeley Milne, British admiral (d. 1938)
 June 14 – Robert M. La Follette, American politician (d. 1925)
 June 18 – Alice Sudduth Byerly, American temperance activist (d. 1904)
 June 28 – Theodor Reuss, German occultist (d. 1923)

July–December 

 July 26 – Ferdinand Tönnies, German sociologist (d. 1936)
 August 25 – Hugo von Pohl, German admiral (d. 1916)
 August 28 – Alexander Bethell, British admiral (d. 1932)
 August 31 – Vsevolod Rudnev, Russian admiral (d. 1913)
 September 5 – Henry Victor Deligny, French general (d. 1938)
 September 8 – Marieta de Veintemilla, Ecuadorian first lady, women's rights activist (d. 1907)
 September 9 – Houston Stewart Chamberlain, British-born German writer (d. 1927)
 September 15 – Orishatukeh Faduma, Guyana-born African-American Christian missionary, educator and advocate for African culture (d. 1946) 
 September 17 – Effie Ellsler, American actress (d. 1942)
 September 25 – James P. Parker, United States Navy commodore (d. 1942)
 October 10 – Eduard von Capelle, German admiral (d. 1931)
 October 12 – Arthur Nikisch, Hungarian conductor (d. 1922)
 November 1 – Templin Potts, American naval officer; 11th Naval Governor of Guam (d. 1927)
 November 5
Léon Teisserenc de Bort, French meteorologist (d. 1913)
Eugene V. Debs, American union leader (d. 1926)
 November 6 – E. S. Gosney, American philanthropist, eugenicist (d. 1942)
 November 8 – Nikolaos Triantafyllakos, Prime Minister of Greece (d. 1939)
 December 16 – Alice Mary Dowd, American educator, poet (d. 1943)
 December 29 – William Thompson Sedgwick, American teacher, epidemiologist and bacteriologist (d. 1921)

Date unknown 

 Florence Huntley, American humorist and occult author (d. 1912)
 Flora Haines Loughead, American miner; mother of Allan Lockheed, founder of Lockheed aerospace company (d. 1943)
 Katharine A. O'Keeffe O'Mahoney, Irish-born American teacher of poetry to Robert Frost (d. 1918)

Deaths

January–June 

 January 6 – Giacomo Beltrami, Italian explorer (b. 1779)
 January 8 – Diponegoro, Leader of Javanese Rebellion (b. 1785)
 January 10 – Mary Russell Mitford, English novelist, dramatist (b. 1787)
 January 15 – Henri Braconnot, French chemist, pharmacist (b. 1780)
 January 17 – Shūsaku Narimasa Chiba, Japanese swordsman (b. 1792)
 January 26 – Gérard de Nerval, French writer (b. 1808)
 February 6 – Josef Munzinger, Member of the Swiss Federal Council (b. 1791)
 February 23 – Carl Friedrich Gauss, German mathematician, astronomer, and physicist (b. 1777)
 March 2 – Emperor Nicholas I of Russia (b. 1796)
March 6– Bandō Shūka I, Japanese Kabuki actor (b. 1813)
 March 8 – William Poole, infamous member of New York City's Bowery Boys Gang (b. 1821)
 March 29 – Henri Druey, member of the Swiss Federal Council (b. 1799)
 March 31 – Charlotte Brontë, English author (b. 1816)
 May 5 – Sir Robert Inglis, English politician (b. 1786)
 May 23 – Charles Robert Malden, English explorer (b. 1797)
 May 30 – Mary Reibey, Australian businesswoman (b. 1777)
 June 7 – Friederike Lienig, Latvian entomologist (b. 1790) 
 June 28 – FitzRoy Somerset, 1st Baron Raglan, commander of British forces in the Crimean War (b. 1788)

July–December 

 July 12 (June 30 O.S.) – Pavel Nakhimov, Russian admiral (b. 1802)
 August 7 – Mariano Arista, President of Mexico (b. 1802)
 August 12 – Helen Hunt Jackson, American activist (b. 1830)
 August 30 – Feargus O'Connor, British political radical, Chartist leader (b. 1794)
 September 7 – William Barton Wade Dent, U.S. Congressman (b. 1806)
 November 11 – Søren Kierkegaard, Danish philosopher (b. 1813)
 September 20 – José Trinidad Reyes, Honduran Father, national hero, and founder of Autonomous National University of Honduras (b. 1797)
 November 26 – Adam Mickiewicz, Lithuanian-Polish poet, writer (b. 1798)
 December 6 – William John Swainson, English naturalist, artist  (b. 1789)

References

Further reading